The large moth subfamily Lymantriinae contains the following genera:

References 

Lymantriinae
Lymantriid genera